The 1995 Embassy World Professional Darts Championship was held from 1 to 8 January 1995 at the Lakeside Country Club in Frimley Green, Surrey. Richie Burnett became the second Welshman to be crowned World Champion after the inaugural winner Leighton Rees.  Burnett defeated Dutchman Raymond van Barneveld 6 sets to 3 in the final.  Defending champion John Part of Canada lost in the second round to qualifier Paul Williams.

This particular edition saw Peter Wright make his World Championship debut, where he would lose to Burnett in the first round. He eventually became world champion 25 years later by winning the 2020 PDC World Darts Championship.

Seeds
  Steve Beaton
  Richie Burnett
  John Part
  Martin Adams
  Mike Gregory
  Andy Fordham
  Sean Palfrey
  Colin Monk

Prize money
The prize money was £138,200.

Champion: £34,000
Runner-Up: £17,000
Semi-Finalists (2): £8,000
Quarter-Finalists (4): £4,000
Last 16 (8): £3,000
Last 32 (16): £1,950

There was also a 9 Dart Checkout prize of £52,000, along with a High Checkout prize of £1,600.

The Results

References

BDO World Darts Championships
BDO World Darts Championships
BDO World Darts Championship
BDO World Darts Championship
Sport in Surrey
Frimley Green